"The Fat and the Furriest" is the fifth episode of the fifteenth season of the American animated television series The Simpsons. It originally aired on the Fox network in the United States on November 30, 2003.

Plot
Homer goes to Sprawl-Mart, and he buys Marge a "Kitchen Carnival" for Mother's Day, a machine that houses a cotton candy maker, a vat of liquid caramel, and a deep fryer. Eventually Homer uses it to make a giant ball of deep-fried, caramel-covered, cotton candy. When it becomes too dirty and inedible, Marge orders him to take it to the dump. While there, he is confronted by a large grizzly bear, from whom he cowers. The bear eventually wanders off without attacking, annoyed by Homer's tearful cowering. The incident becomes well known due to a nearby hunter with a camera.

Homer becomes a nervous wreck, hallucinating and seeing bears like Winnie-the-Pooh, Paddington Bear, Smokey Bear, the Snuggle Bear, Teddy Grahams, the Chicago Bears, and an "Intensive Care Bear." To add insult to injury, the hunter's tape is shown on the news, and Homer is mocked by many. Homer hires the hunter, named Grant, to assist him in confronting the animal. Homer makes a near-useless suit of armor: despite Marge's objections, Bart, Lenny and Carl join him as they start on their quest.

The four of them make camp in the woods. As his homemade armor is hot, Homer eventually takes it off and bathes in a stream, where he is again attacked by the bear. With Bart, Lenny and Carl dancing to the radio and paying no attention, the bear drags Homer to his cave. Deciding to die facing the bear as a man, Homer later discovers that the bear is only angry and hostile because of the painful electrical prod that Grant attached to the bear's ear. To make sure of it, Homer takes the tag off the bear and tries it on himself, resulting in a lot of pain before taking it off. Because of being freed from the electrical prod, the bear reverts to his friendly state, licking Homer and giving him a bear hug as a thanks.

Realizing this, Homer becomes friends with the bear. In the meantime, Marge and Lisa have discovered Homer, Bart, and the suit of armor missing, and Marge hires Grant to help track Homer down, though Lisa disapproves of Grant's methods to take down the bear. Homer decides to take the bear to a nearby wildlife refuge, but on the way, they are attacked by Grant and other hunters. To ensure the bear's survival, Homer dresses the bear up in the homemade armor, which surprisingly resists the gunfire and allows the bear to reach the wildlife refuge where he is promptly attacked by Stampy the elephant, but then fights back against him for good. It is then the whole family declares to be proud of Homer for his efforts of saving the bear from the hunters, to which he responds that he loves nature.

Cultural references
The title is a parody of the 2001 movie The Fast and the Furious.

After Homer returns home after the incident with the bear, Homer frightened by the fact that bears appear in various household items, such as Snuggle, Gummy bears, Teddy Grahams and Super sugar crisp cereal, as well as in books such as The Bear Went Over the Mountain, The Berenstain Bears and Goldilocks and the Three Bears. Whilst sitting in the corner frighten by this revelation, Homer is confronted by many fictional bears, such as Gummy Bears, a Teddy bear, Paddington Bear, Winnie the Pooh, Teddy Grahams, Smokey Bear, two bears wearing the Chicago Bears uniforms and an "intensive Care Bear" to the instrumental version of "Teddy Bears' Picnic", which transitions into "Jarabe tapatio".

In the scene where Homer makes his bear-fighting suit, the Survivor song "Eye of the Tiger" is heard.

After Homer befriends the bear that attacked him, the Sonny & Cher song "I Got You Babe" plays during a montage showing the two bonding.

The song that Lenny, Carl and Bart are singing and dancing to is "Afternoon Delight" by Starland Vocal Band.

At the shopping mall, a spoof of VeggieTales is seen on the TVs with King Rameses depicted as a yam and Moses depicted as a pickle pleading "Let my pickles go".

In one scene, Grandpa shows Homer his own website Oldcoot.com. The domain name is a real-life website owned by Samuel L. Bowman. Some fans of oldcoot.com suggested that Bowman sue The Simpsons, though Bowman ultimately decided not to pursue legal action, as it wasn't the "character of the company".

The creation of bear-proof armor after surviving a bear attack (but not Homer's public cowardice) was inspired by Troy Hurtubise, whose story was told in the documentary Project Grizzly.

References

External links

The Simpsons (season 15) episodes
2003 American television episodes